Markovac may refer to several places:

 , a village near Čelinac, Bosnia and Herzegovina
 Markovac (Mladenovac), a village in Serbia
 Markovac (Vršac), a village in Serbia
 Markovac (Velika Plana), a village in Serbia
 Markovac, Bjelovar-Bilogora County, a village in Croatia
 Markovac, Istria County, a village near Višnjan, Croatia
 Markovac, Požega-Slavonia County, a village near Velika, Croatia
 Markovac, Šibenik-Knin County, a village near Biskupija, Croatia
 Dubravski Markovac, a village near Dubrava, Zagreb County, Croatia
 Markovac Križevački, a village in Croatia
 Markovac Našički, a village in Croatia
 , a village near Farkaševac, Croatia
 Trojstveni Markovac, a village in Croatia

See also
 Marko (disambiguation)